Petitot may refer to:

 Émile Petitot (1838–1916), French Missionary Oblate, and Canadian northwest cartographer, ethnologist, geographer, linguist, and writer
 Petitot River, in northern Alberta and British Columbia, Canada, named in honor of Émile Petitot
 Jean Petitot (1607–1691), French-Swiss enamel painter
 Jean Louis Petitot (1652–c. 1730), French enamel painter; eldest son of Jean Petitot 
 Louis Petitot (1794–1862), French sculptor
 Ennemond Alexandre Petitot  (Lyon, 1727 – Parma, 1801), French architect active in Parma, Italy